Kristine Andersen (born April 2, 1976) is a former Danish team handball player and two times Olympic champion. She won a gold medal with the Danish national team at the 1996 Summer Olympics in Atlanta, and again eight years later at the 2004 Summer Olympics in Athens.

References

External links

1976 births
Living people
Danish female handball players
Olympic gold medalists for Denmark
Handball players at the 1996 Summer Olympics
Handball players at the 2004 Summer Olympics
Olympic medalists in handball
Medalists at the 2004 Summer Olympics
Medalists at the 1996 Summer Olympics